Pernattia is a genus of moths in the family Lasiocampidae. It was described by David Stephen Fletcher in 1982. It consists of the following species:
Pernattia chlorophragma
Pernattia brevipennis
Pernattia pusilla

References

External links

Lasiocampidae